Georges Ngoma-Nanitélamio (born 7 June 1978) is a Congolese footballer. He played in nine matches for the Congo national football team in 1999 and 2000. He was also named in Congo's squad for the 2000 African Cup of Nations tournament.

Career statistics

International

International goals
Scores and results list Congo's goal tally first.

References

1978 births
Living people
Republic of the Congo footballers
Republic of the Congo international footballers
2000 African Cup of Nations players
Place of birth missing (living people)
Association football forwards
Sabé Sports players
Republic of the Congo expatriate footballers
Republic of the Congo expatriate sportspeople in Ivory Coast
Expatriate footballers in Ivory Coast